Félix Goethals (14 January 1891 in Rinxent – 24 September 1962 in Capinghem) was a French professional road bicycle racer, who won seven stages in total in the Tour de France. His best final classification was a ninth place in 1920.

Major results

1913
Circuit de Champagne
1914
Circuit de Calais
1920
Tour de France:
Winner stage 14
1921
París-Bourganeuf
Tour de France:
Winner stages 11, 14 and 15
1923
Tour de France:
Winner stages 14 and 15
1924
Tour de France:
Winner stage 4
1925
Paris-Calais

External links 

Official Tour de France results for Félix Goethals

French male cyclists
1891 births
1962 deaths
French Tour de France stage winners
People from Boulogne-sur-Mer
Sportspeople from Pas-de-Calais
Cyclists from Hauts-de-France